Aw Boon-Haw (1882 in Rangoon, British Burma, British Raj – 1954 in Honolulu, Hawaii, United States), OBE, was a Chinese entrepreneur and philanthropist best known as founder of Tiger Balm. He was a son of Hakka herbalist Aw Chu-Kin, with his ancestral home in Yongding County, Fujian, China.

Career
Aw was born to Chinese herbalists in Rangoon, Burma on 1882 under the British colonial government. In 1926, due to problems with the British Colonial government at the time, Aw migrated to Malaysia and expanded their business overseas to South East Asia, where he cofounded the business with his brother. Aw  used cartoon commercialisation to promote their Balm product to any potential customer as well as at any public celebration. In the 1920s, his main factory, Eng Aun Tong, was set up at 89 Neil Road, Chinatown, Singapore. Aw also founded several newspapers, including Sin Chew Jit Poh and Sin Pin Jit Poh; and Sing Tao Daily.

Aw fled to Hong Kong during World War II and managed the business from there, while his brother stayed in Singapore until he closed down the factory and went to Rangoon. Aw returned to Singapore after the end of World War II and re-established his business. He set up Chung Khiaw Bank and once owned Pulau Serangoon (present day Coney Island), Singapore.

Death
In 1954, at the age of 72, Aw died from a heart attack following a major operation in Honolulu while on a trip to Hong Kong from Boston, US. He is remembered through his work with Haw Par Villas throughout Asia, with locations in Singapore, Hong Kong, and the Fujian province of China.

Legacy
His sons took over his businesses after Aw's death.

Personal life
Aw had an adopted daughter, Sally Aw, a Hong Kong businesswoman and former politician.

The daughter of Aw Boon-Haw and his fourth wife, Aw Seng (胡星), resides in Singapore and has set up a company under her father's name, Aw Boon Haw Pte Ltd, to continue the heritage and legacy of her father. Aw Boon-Haw's fourth wife died on 10 April 2012 in Vancouver aged 100.

Gallery

References

 胡文虎
 胡文虎父女的汕頭緣
 Sin Yee Theng and Nicolai Volland, "Aw Boon Haw, the Tiger from Nanyang: Social Entrepreneurship, Transregional Journalism, and Public Culture," chapter 5 in Christopher Rea and Nicolai Volland, eds. "The Business of Culture: Cultural Entrepreneurs in China and Southeast Asia" (UBC Press, 2015).
 Cochran, Sherman. Chinese Medicine Men: Consumer Culture in China and Southeast Asia. Cambridge: Harvard University Press, 2006.
 King, Sam (1992), Tiger Balm king : the life and times of Aw Boon Haw. Singapore :  Times Books International, 1992. 

1882 births
1954 deaths
Burmese people of Chinese descent
People from Yongding District, Longyan
Singaporean people of Hakka descent
Hong Kong people of Hakka descent
20th-century Singaporean businesspeople
Burmese emigrants to Singapore
Aw family
Officers of the Order of the British Empire
Hong Kong newspaper people
Singaporean billionaires